Ernest Albert Lachner (3 April 1915, New Castle, Pennsylvania – 7 January 1996, Winchester, Virginia) was an American ichthyologist with an international reputation for his research on Indo-Pacific gobies and cardinalfishes.

Biography
Lachner graduated with a bachelor's degree from Pennsylvania State University. While enrolled in college, he went to Mexico and participated in biological and geographical surveys there. By 1939, he worked on New York State ichthyological surveys. During WW II he served as a master sergeant in the United States Army Force. As an oceanographic observer, he flew on B-25s in weather reconnaissance missions over the Indian Ocean. In 1946 he graduated with a Ph.D. in zoology from Cornell University.

Beginning in 1949, Lachner was employed for 34 years by the Smithsonian Institution as a curator of fishes at the National Museum of Natural History. He retired in 1983 as curator emeritus.

Lachner was the author or co-author of 85 scientific reports on ichthyology and related issues in museum curation. He was awarded Guggenheim Fellowships in 1955 and 1959. He participated in Cruise 4B of the research vessel Anton Bruun. The purpose of the cruise, which lasted from early November to mid-December in 1962, was "to evaluate the relative distribution and abundance of benthic organisms inhabiting the continental shelf and uppoer slope of the Arabian Sea."

Taxon described by him
See :Category:Taxa named by Ernest A. Lachner
He named Eviota albolineata, commonly called spotted fringefin goby or whitelined eviota.

Taxon named in his honor 
Lachneratus phasmaticus and at least four other fish species have been named in his honor.

The Tombigbee darter Etheostoma lachneri is named in his honor.

Mesogobio lachneri Bănărescu & Nalbant 1973was also named after him.

The Goby Sueviota lachneri R. Winterbottom & Hoese, 1988 is named for him.

Death
Upon his death he was survived by his widow, Anna Mary Lachner, two daughters, a son, and four grandchildren. Another son died at age 10.

Selected publications

References

External links
 (taxon names authored by Lachner)

1915 births
1996 deaths
American ichthyologists
American curators
20th-century American zoologists
Pennsylvania State University alumni
Cornell University alumni
People from New Castle, Pennsylvania
Smithsonian Institution people